Hsu Shu-ching (born 9 May 1991) is a Taiwanese weightlifter.

Early life
Hsu, of Hakka descent, was born in Lunbei, Yunlin, Taiwan. She played basketball in high school, switching to weightlifting at the age of 13, after the school disbanded its basketball team. Hsu attends Kaohsiung Medical University.

Weightlifting career
Hsu was coached by Tsai Wen-yee. She won a gold medal in the women's 53 kg at the 2012 London Olympics, after the original gold medalist, Zulfiya Chinshanlo failed a doping retest. At the 2014 Asian Games, she set a world record in the same event, with a lift of 233 kg. Hsu won another gold medal in the women's 53 kg at the 2016 Summer Olympics. Hsu announced her decision to retire from competition in June 2018, citing injuries sustained in the 2017 World Weightlifting Championships.

In March 2019, the Chinese Taipei Olympic Committee disclosed that Hsu underwent a drug test prior to the 2017 World Weightlifting Championships. Her sample tested positive for a banned substance in January 2018, and the CTOC subsequently placed Hsu under a three-year ban from competition. Hsu's test result was not publicized until March 2019, after the World Anti-Doping Agency issued a deadline for the Chinese Taipei Olympic Committee to release the information. Hsu's 2012 Olympic gold medal is scheduled to be formally conferred in 2021, and she will become the first Taiwanese competitor to have received two Olympic gold medals.

References

1991 births
Living people
People from Yunlin County
Taiwanese people of Hakka descent
Hakka sportspeople
Taiwanese female weightlifters
Olympic weightlifters of Taiwan
Olympic gold medalists for Taiwan
Olympic medalists in weightlifting
Weightlifters at the 2012 Summer Olympics
Weightlifters at the 2016 Summer Olympics
Medalists at the 2012 Summer Olympics
Medalists at the 2016 Summer Olympics
Asian Games medalists in weightlifting
Weightlifters at the 2010 Asian Games
Weightlifters at the 2014 Asian Games
World record holders in Olympic weightlifting
Kaohsiung Medical University alumni
World Weightlifting Championships medalists
Asian Games gold medalists for Chinese Taipei
Medalists at the 2014 Asian Games
Universiade medalists in weightlifting
Taiwanese sportspeople in doping cases
Universiade silver medalists for Chinese Taipei
Recipients of the Order of Brilliant Star
Medalists at the 2011 Summer Universiade
20th-century Taiwanese women
21st-century Taiwanese women